Doctor Akakia (French: Histoire du Docteur Akakia et du Natif de St Malo) is a satirical book of a very biting nature by Voltaire, directed against pretentious pedants of science in the person of Maupertuis, the President of the Royal Academy of Sciences at Berlin. It so excited the anger of Frederick the Great, the patron of the Academy, that he ordered it to be  burnt by the common hangman, after 30,000 copies of it had been sold in Paris.

External links
 FACETIE : Histoire du docteur AKAKIA - Partie 1 - Bienvenue chez Monsieur de VOLTAIRE 
 Histoire du Docteur Akakia et du Natif de St-Malo 

18th-century essays
Works by Voltaire
Year of work missing
1753 works